Nikola Milojević was the defending champion but lost in the first round to Eduard Esteve Lobato.

Flavio Cobolli won the title after defeating Daniel Michalski 6–4, 6–2 in the final.

Seeds

Draw

Finals

Top half

Bottom half

References

External links
Main draw
Qualifying draw

Zadar Open - 1